Komi Can't Communicate is a manga series written and illustrated by . The series follows the Japanese high school student Shoko Komi, who is suffering from a crippling social anxiety disorder, on her quest to make 100 friends with the help of her classmate Hitohito Tadano.

Before its serialization, a one-shot chapter was published in Shogakukan's Weekly Shōnen Sunday on September 16, 2015; the series began serialization in the same magazine on May 18, 2016. Shogakukan has collected its chapters into individual tankōbon volumes. The first volume was published on September 16, 2016. As of January 18, 2023, twenty-eight volumes have been published.

In November 2018, during their panel at Anime NYC, Viz Media announced that they acquired the license for the manga. The first volume was released in North America on June 11, 2019. The manga is licensed in Southeast Asia by Shogakukan Asia, in Taiwan by Chingwin Publishing Group, in South Korea by SomyMedia, in Thailand by Luckpim, in Indonesia by Elex Media Komputindo, in Vietnam by Kim Đồng Publishing House, in France by Pika Édition, in Germany by Tokyopop, in Italy by J-Pop, in Argentina and Spain by Editorial Ivrea and in Brazil and Mexico by Panini Comics. In Turkey, in March 2022, Marmara Cizgi licensed the manga and released on 26 April 2022.

Volume list
The chapters are labeled as "コミュ" (komyu) in Japanese and as "Communications" in the English translation.

References 

Komi Can't Communicate 
Chapters